Narcisa Georgeta Lecuşanu (née Paunica; born 14 September 1976 in Bacău, Socialist Republic of Romania)  is a retired Romanian handballer who played for the Romanian national team. She received a silver medal in the 2005 World Championship. She also participated in the 2008 Summer Olympics held at Beijing (China), where Romania placed seventh.

Achievements

Club
Kometal Skopje
Macedonian League:
Champion: 1997, 1998
Macedonian Cup:
Winner: 1997, 1998

Borussia Dortmund
German League
Runner-up: 1999
EHF Cup:
Semi-Finalist: 2000

TV Lützellinden
German League:
Champion: 2001

Ikast-Bording EH
Danish League:
Runner-up: 2003
Danish Cup:
Finalist: 2003, 2004
Cup Winners' Cup:
Winner: 2004
Champions Trophy:
Semi-Finalist: 2003
Champions League:
Semi-Finalist: 2003

Aalborg DH
Champions League:
Semi-Finalist: 2006

Oltchim Râmnicu Vâlcea:
Romanian League
Champion: 2007, 2008, 2009, 2010
Romanian Cup:
Winner: 2007
Romanian Supercup:
Winner: 2007
Champions Trophy:
Winner: 2007
Cup Winners' Cup:
Winner: 2007
Champions League:
Runner-up: 2010
Semi-Finalist: 2009

National team 
Youth World Championship:
Gold Medallist: 1995
World Championship:
Silver Medallist: 2005
Fourth place: 2007

References

Selected publications

External links

Narcisa Lecușanu at IHF.info website

1976 births
Living people
Sportspeople from Bacău
Romanian female handball players
Handball players at the 2008 Summer Olympics
Olympic handball players of Romania
Expatriate handball players
Romanian expatriate sportspeople in North Macedonia
Romanian expatriate sportspeople in Germany
Romanian expatriate sportspeople in Denmark
Romanian sports executives and administrators
SCM Râmnicu Vâlcea (handball) players